Basics is an album by saxophonist Houston Person recorded in 1987 and released on the Muse label in 1989.

Reception

Allmusic reviewer Scott Yanow noted "Tenor saxophonist Houston Person has stuck to his singular musical path throughout his career, playing uncomplicated but soulful and swinging renditions of blues, ballads, and jazz standards for a couple decades, ignoring current (and usually short-lived) musical trends. ... the songs sound brand new and almost as if they were written for him. Recommended".

Track listing 
 "What a Diff'rence a Day Made" (María Grever, Stanley Adams) − 7:29
 "Stormy Weather" (Harold Arlen, Ted Koehler) − 8:49
 "St. Thomas" (Sonny Rollins) − 5:38
 "Some Other Spring" (Arthur Herzog Jr., Irene Kitchings) − 7:51
 "Time After Time" (Jule Styne, Sammy Cahn) − 7:34	
 "Sweet Slumber" (Lucky Millinder, Al J. Neiburg, Henri Woode) − 8:00	
 "Triste" (Antônio Carlos Jobim) − 8:36

Personnel 
Houston Person − tenor saxophone 
Stan Hope − piano
Peter Martin Weiss − bass
Cecil Brooks III − drums
Ralph Dorsey − congas, percussion

References 

Houston Person albums
1989 albums
Muse Records albums
Albums recorded at Van Gelder Studio